Club Atlético Lugano is an Argentine football club from Tapiales neighborhood in La Matanza Partido, Greater Buenos Aires. The team currently plays in Primera D, the regionalised 5th level of Argentine football league system.

The club was founded on 18 November 1915 by workers of French-owned railway company Compañía General de Ferrocarriles en la Provincia de Buenos Aires (then Ferrocarril General Manuel Belgrano). Its original name was "Club Compañía General Belgrano". The team earned its affiliation to Argentine Football Association in 1924 in order to compete in the intermediate category. in 1953 General Belgrano changed its name to "Club Atlético General Belgrano de Lugano".

In 1972 General Belgrano was affiliated to the Argentine Football Association and started playing in Primera D. In 1986 the name changed again to "Club Atlético Lugano", as a tribute to team's neighbourhood, Villa Lugano.

Team 2019

Titles
Primera D: 1
 1987–88

External links

(Fans site) 

Association football clubs established in 1915
Football clubs in Buenos Aires Province
La Matanza Partido
1915 establishments in Argentina